The 1st Infantry Regiment, later the 1st Infantry Regiment of the Lithuanian Grand Duke Gediminas was an infantry regiment that served in the Lithuanian Army during the Interwar period.

Formation 
 was made the regiment's commander on 1 November 1918. The regiment began forming in Vilnius, although in a covert manner, because the occupying German authorities hampered the formation of the Lithuanian Army. So, the regiment officially began forming only on 23 November 1918. On December 7, the regiment included 31 officers and 59 soldiers. In ten days, the number gradually increased to 33 officers, 3 military officials, military doctor L. Janulionis and 87 soldiers.

Lithuanian–Soviet War 
By 11 February 1919, the regiment had 36 officers, 13 military officials, one military doctor and 678 soldiers. At the time, the regiment was divided into two battalions, with the first one, led by the officer , being composed of two infantry and one machine gun companies, while the remaining second battalion under officer Pranas Tamašauskas had just three infantry companies, that were not fully formed. The regiment's casualties were one officer, i.e. the regimental commander, Antanas Juozapavičius, and a few soldiers killed, while 20 soldiers were captured as prisoners of war, some of whom escaped captivity.

On April 25, the 1st Infantry Regiment included 57 officers, 21 military officials, and 1,640 soldiers. At the end of August 1919, the regiment had 52 officers, 15 military officials, including three doctors and the military chaplain Catholic priest Pranas Garmus, and 1,733 soldiers, of whom 1,316 were trained.

From 30 October 1919, the regiment's patron was the Grand Duke of Lithuania Gediminas. Due to the regiment's merits in combat against Bolsheviks and because it began in Vilnius, founded by Gediminas according to legend, the regiment was accorded Gediminas' name.

1920 
On 15 December 1920, the regiment was staffed by 46 officers, 10 military officials, one military chaplain and 2,333 soldiers. However, the regiment was lacking 26 officers and 537 soldiers until completion of the establishment.

Interwar 
From 1923 to 1939, the regiment was located in Ukmergė.

First Soviet Occupation 
After Lithuania was occupied by the Soviet Union in 1940, on 2 July, the Lithuanian Army was renamed the Lithuanian People's Army. The name of the unit's patron was removed on 24 July 1940. Finally, the regiment was disbanded on 26 October 1940.

References

Sources 

 

Military units and formations established in 1918
Military units and formations disestablished in 1940
Infantry regiments of Lithuania